A Boolean-valued function (sometimes called a predicate or a proposition) is a function of the type f : X → B, where X is an arbitrary set and where B is a Boolean domain, i.e. a generic two-element set, (for example B = {0, 1}), whose elements are interpreted as logical values, for example, 0 = false and 1 = true, i.e., a single bit of information.

In the formal sciences, mathematics, mathematical logic, statistics, and their applied disciplines, a Boolean-valued function may also be referred to as a characteristic function, indicator function, predicate, or proposition. In all of these uses, it is understood that the various terms refer to a mathematical object and not the corresponding semiotic sign or syntactic expression.

In formal semantic theories of truth, a truth predicate is a predicate on the sentences of a formal language, interpreted for logic, that formalizes the intuitive concept that is normally expressed by saying that a sentence is true. A truth predicate may have additional domains beyond the formal language domain, if that is what is required to determine a final truth value.

See also

 Bit
 Boolean data type
 Boolean algebra (logic)
 Boolean domain
 Boolean logic
 Propositional calculus
 Truth table
 Logic minimization
 Indicator function
 Predicate
 Proposition
 Finitary boolean function
 Boolean function

References
 Brown, Frank Markham (2003), Boolean Reasoning:  The Logic of Boolean Equations, 1st edition, Kluwer Academic Publishers, Norwell, MA.  2nd edition, Dover Publications, Mineola, NY, 2003.
 Kohavi, Zvi (1978), Switching and Finite Automata Theory, 1st edition, McGraw–Hill, 1970.  2nd edition, McGraw–Hill, 1978. 3rd edition, McGraw–Hill, 2010.
 Korfhage, Robert R. (1974), Discrete Computational Structures, Academic Press, New York, NY.
 Mathematical Society of Japan, Encyclopedic Dictionary of Mathematics, 2nd edition, 2 vols., Kiyosi Itô (ed.), MIT Press, Cambridge, MA, 1993.  Cited as EDM.
 Minsky, Marvin L., and Papert, Seymour, A. (1988), Perceptrons, An Introduction to Computational Geometry, MIT Press, Cambridge, MA, 1969.  Revised, 1972.  Expanded edition, 1988.

Boolean algebra